Wilhelmina ("Winnie") van Weerdenburg (1 October 1946 – 27 October 1998) was a Dutch swimmer who won a bronze medal in the 4×100 metres freestyle relay at the 1964 Summer Olympics in Tokyo. Her team mates in that race, clocked in 4:12.0, were Toos Beumer, Erica Terpstra and Pauline van der Wildt. At her only individual start in Japan, on the 100 m freestyle, she was eliminated in the heats.

References

1946 births
1998 deaths
Olympic swimmers of the Netherlands
Dutch female freestyle swimmers
Swimmers at the 1964 Summer Olympics
Olympic bronze medalists for the Netherlands
Swimmers from The Hague
Olympic bronze medalists in swimming
Medalists at the 1964 Summer Olympics
20th-century Dutch women